The Man in the Shadow is a 1926 American silent drama film directed by David Hartford and starring David Torrence, Mary McAllister and Joseph Bennett.

Cast
 David Torrence as 	Robert Rodman
 Mary McAllister as 	Lucy Rodman
 Arthur Rankin as 	Bob Rodman
 Joseph Bennett as Dallis Alvoid
 Myrtle Stedman as 	Mary Alvoid
 John T. Dwyer as Thomas Walsh
 Margaret Fielding as 	Kate Jackson
 Edward Coxen as 	Harry Jackson

References

Bibliography
 Connelly, Robert B. The Silents: Silent Feature Films, 1910-36, Volume 40, Issue 2. December Press, 1998.
 Munden, Kenneth White. The American Film Institute Catalog of Motion Pictures Produced in the United States, Part 1. University of California Press, 1997.

External links
 

1926 films
1926 drama films
1920s English-language films
American silent feature films
Silent American drama films
Films directed by David Hartford
American black-and-white films
1920s American films